Voxxclub is a German Neue Volksmusik band.

History
The group was founded in Munich in 2012 by Martin Simma, who then also took over the management, along with students Michael Hartinger, Korbinian Arendt, Christian Schild, Florian Claus, Stefan Raaflaub and Julian David. The band members come from Germany, Austria, and Switzerland. The group became known through two music videos, which they staged as if they were flash mobs, in which the band performed with a newly produced version of the song "Rock mi" (originally by the Alpenrebellen).

One criticism that was repeatedly stated was that the band's image was predetermined by the music industry; this was reinforced by the group's appearances in Lederhosen, seemingly alpine style of music and the fact that all the band members except Julian David and Florian Claus  were prior to their involvement with Voxxclub primarily actors or musical actors.

Their debut album, Alpin, was released in March 2013 and reached the top 30 in Germany and Austria, which it held for several weeks. In Switzerland, it reached the top 50 for two weeks. The single "Rock mi" peaked at number 44 in both Germany and Austria and stayed on the German chart for 10 weeks, and on the Austrian chart for seven weeks. For Oktoberfest, the album was re-released with five additional songs and re-entered the charts, as did their single. The title "Rock mi" became in the interpretation of Voxxclub a popular song at the Oktoberfest.

In 2014, Voxxclub was nominated for an Echo Music Prize in the Folk Music category. In the same year, the group released in Hamburg with Roland Spremberg the album Ziwui. The title of the album goes back to the Tyrolean folk song "Ziwui" ("The song of the bird catcher", also called "Höttinger bird catcher song"), but is, except for the name, a completely new composition.

In 2014, Voxxclub went on a solo tour in Germany, Austria, and Switzerland and in the same year did the "Festival of festivals" tour. On May 4, 2015, members announced on their Facebook page that Julian David was leaving the band.  In 2015, Voxxclub were again guests on the tour "Festival of Festivals - The party continues". In 2015 Voxxclub's album Ziwui was nominated for an Echo in the category "Folk Music"

Voxxclub released their third album, Geiles Himmelblau (Cool Blue-sky), in February 2016. They embarked on a solo tour in Germany, Austria and Switzerland, and released the resulting DVD Geiles Himmelblau: Live.

In 2017 Voxxclub was nominated for the third time for the Echo in the category "Folk Music". From March to May 2017, Voxxclub was a guest on the tour "Das große Schlagerfest" in Germany and Austria.

On 22 February 2018, the band took part in Our Song for Lisbon, the German preliminary vote for the Eurovision Song Contest 2018.

Discography
Albums
 Alpin (2013)
 Ziwui (2014)
 Geiles Himmelblau (2016)
 Donnawedda (2017)

Singles
 "Rock mi" (2013) (im Original von den Alpenrebellen, 1996)
 "Woll Ma Tanzn Gehn" (2013)
 "Juchee auf der hohen Alm" (2013) (Originally by Münchner Zwietracht, 1991)
 "Wild's Wasser" (2013) (Originally by Seern, 1999)
 "Ewige Liebe" (2013) (Originally by Mash, 2000)
 "Rock mi (Après Ski Party Mix)" (2013)
 "Ziwui" (2014)
 "'Donnawedda" (2017)
 "I mog Di so" (2018)

Awards
 smago! Award
 2013: Shooting star of the year
 2016: for the most successful group Volxpop 
 Die Eins der Besten
 2014 und 2015
 Mein Star des Jahres
 2014: Best Folk Music Star

References

External links
 

2012 establishments in Germany
German boy bands
German folk music groups
German pop music groups
Musical groups established in 2012
Musical groups from Munich
Vocal quintets